Sergey Vekhtev (born 8 May 1971) is a Belarusian professional football coach and former player. He is the manager of Russian club Elektron Veliky Novgorod.

Career

In 1995, Vekhtev signed for Borussia Dortmund.

Honours
Lokomotiv-96 Vitebsk
Belarusian Cup winner: 1997–98

Belshina Bobruisk
Belarusian Premier League champion: 2001
Belarusian Cup winner: 2000–01

References

External links
 
 Profile at teams.by
 

1971 births
Living people
People from Smolensk
Belarusian footballers
Association football forwards
Belarus international footballers
Belarusian expatriate footballers
Expatriate footballers in Germany
Expatriate footballers in Russia
Expatriate footballers in China
Belarusian Premier League players
Russian Premier League players
FC Vitebsk players
Borussia Dortmund II players
FC Belshina Bobruisk players
FC Slavia Mozyr players
FC Torpedo Mogilev players
FC Naftan Novopolotsk players
FC Baltika Kaliningrad players
Wuhan Guanggu players
Belarusian football managers
Belarusian expatriate football managers
Expatriate football managers in Russia
FC Vitebsk managers
FC Orsha managers